Chaff, originally called Window by the British and Düppel by the Second World War era German Luftwaffe (from the Berlin suburb where it was first developed), is a radar countermeasure in which aircraft or other targets spread a cloud of small, thin pieces of aluminium, metallized glass fibre or plastic, which either appears as a cluster of primary targets on radar screens or swamps the screen with multiple returns, in order to confuse and distract.

Modern armed forces use chaff (in naval applications, for instance, using short-range SRBOC rockets) to distract radar-guided missiles from their targets. Most military aircraft and warships have chaff dispensing systems for self-defense. An intercontinental ballistic missile may release in its midcourse phase several independent warheads as well as penetration aids such as decoy balloons and chaff.

Modern radar systems can distinguish chaff from target objects by measuring the Doppler shift; chaff quickly loses speed compared to an aircraft and thus shows a characteristic change in frequency that allows it to be filtered out. This has led to new techniques where the chaff is further illuminated by an additional signal from the target vehicle with the proper Doppler frequency. This is known as JAFF (jammer plus chaff) or CHILL (chaff-illuminated).

Second World War 

The idea of using chaff developed independently in the United Kingdom, Germany, the United States and Japan. In 1937, British researcher Gerald Touch, while working with Robert Watson-Watt on radar, suggested that lengths of wire suspended from balloons or parachutes might overwhelm a radar system with false echoes and R. V. Jones had suggested that pieces of metal foil falling through the air might do the same. In early 1942, Telecommunications Research Establishment (TRE) researcher Joan Curran investigated the idea and came up with a scheme for dumping packets of aluminium strips from aircraft to generate a cloud of false echoes. An early idea was to use sheets the size of a notebook page; these would be printed so they would also serve as propaganda leaflets. It was found that the most effective version was strips of black paper backed with aluminium foil, exactly  and packed into bundles each weighing . The head of the TRE, A. P. Rowe, code-named the device "Window". In Germany, similar research had led to the development of Düppel. The German code name came from the estate where the first German tests with chaff took place, circa 1942. Once the British had passed the idea to the US via the Tizard Mission, Fred Whipple developed a system for dispensing strips for the USAAF, but it is not known if this was ever used.

The systems used the same concept of small aluminium strips (or wires) cut to a half of the target radar's wavelength. When hit by the radar, such lengths of metal resonate and re-radiate the signal. Opposing defences would find it almost impossible to distinguish the aircraft from the echoes caused by the chaff. Other radar-confusing techniques included airborne jamming devices codenamed Mandrel, Piperack and Jostle. Mandrel was an airborne jammer targeted at the German Freya radars. Ignorance about the extent of knowledge of the principle in the opposing air force led planners to judge that it was too dangerous to use, since the opponent could duplicate it. The British government's leading scientific adviser, Professor Lindemann, pointed out that if the Royal Air Force (RAF) used it against the Germans, the Luftwaffe would quickly copy it and could launch a new Blitz. This caused concern in RAF Fighter Command and Anti-Aircraft Command, who managed to suppress the use of Window until July 1943. It was felt that the new generation of centimetric radars available to Fighter Command would cope with Luftwaffe retaliation.

Examination of the Würzburg radar equipment brought back to the UK during Operation Biting  (February 1942) and subsequent reconnaissance revealed to the British that all German radars were operating in no more than three frequency ranges, making them prone to jamming. Arthur Travers "Bomber" Harris, Commander-in-Chief (C-in-C) of RAF Bomber Command, finally got approval to use Window as part of Operation Gomorrah, the week long bombing campaign against Hamburg. The first aircrew trained to use Window were in 76 Squadron. Twenty-four crews were briefed on how to drop the bundles of aluminised-paper strips (treated-paper was used to minimise the weight and to maximise the time that the strips would remain in the air, prolonging the effect), one every minute through the flare chute, using a stopwatch to time them. The results proved spectacular. The radar-guided master searchlights wandered aimlessly across the sky. The anti-aircraft guns fired randomly or not at all and the night fighters, their radar displays swamped with false echoes, utterly failed to find the bomber stream. For over a week, Allied attacks devastated a vast area of Hamburg, resulting in more than 40,000 civilian deaths, with the loss of only 12 out of the 791 bombers on the first night. Squadrons quickly had special chutes fitted to their bombers to make chaff deployment even easier. Seeing this as a development that made it safer to go on operations, many crews got in as many trips as they could before the Germans found a counter-countermeasure.

Although the metal strips puzzled the German civilians at first, German scientists knew exactly what they were – Düppel – but had refrained from using it for the same reasons as Lindemann had pointed out to the British. For over a year the curious situation arose where both sides of the conflict knew how to use chaff to jam the other side's radar but had refrained from doing so for fear of their opponent replying in kind. Window rendered the ground-controlled Himmelbett (canopy bed) fighters of the Kammhuber Line unable to track their targets in the night sky and rendered the early UHF-band B/C and C-1 versions of the airborne intercept Lichtenstein radar (following the capture of a Junkers Ju 88R-1 night fighter by the British in May 1943 equipped with it) useless, blinding radar-guided guns and spotlights dependent on the ground-based radar. Oberst Hajo Herrmann developed Wilde Sau (Wild Boar) to cope with the lack of accurate ground guidance and led to the formation of three new fighter wings to use the tactic, numbered JG 300, JG 301 and JG 302. Ground operators would radio-direct single-seat fighters and night fighters to areas where the concentrations of chaff were greatest (which would indicate the source of the chaff) for the fighter pilots to see targets, often against the illumination from fires and searchlights below. A few of the single-seat fighters had the FuG 350 Naxos device to detect H2S radar (the first airborne, ground scanning radar system) emissions from the bombers.

Six weeks after the Hamburg raid, the Luftwaffe used Düppel in  lengths during a raid on the night of 7/8 October 1943. In raids in 1943 and the "mini-blitz" of Operation Steinbock between February and May 1944, Düppel allowed German bombers again to attempt operations over London. Although theoretically effective, the small number of bombers, notably in relation to the large RAF night-fighter force, doomed the effort from the start. The British fighters were able to go aloft in large numbers and often found the German bombers in spite of Düppel. The Germans obtained better results during the air raid on Bari in Italy, on 2 December 1943, when Allied radars were deceived by the use of Düppel.

Following the British discovery of it in 1942 by Joan Curran, chaff in the United States was co-invented by astronomer Fred Whipple and Navy engineer Merwyn Bly. Whipple proposed the idea to the Air Force he was working with at the time. Early tests failed as the foil strips stuck together and fell as clumps to little or no effect. Bly solved this by designing a cartridge that forced the strips to rub against it as they were expelled, gaining an electrostatic charge. Since the strips all had a similar charge they repelled each other, enabling the full countermeasure effect. After the war, Bly received the Navy Distinguished Civilian Service Award for his work.

In the Pacific Theatre, Navy Lieutenant Commander Sudo Hajime invented a Japanese version called , or "deceiving paper". It was first used with some success in mid 1943, during night battles over the Solomon Islands. Competing demands for the scarce aluminum necessary for its manufacture limited its use.

Falklands War
British warships in the Falklands War (1982) made heavy use of chaff.

During this war, British Sea Harrier aircraft lacked their conventional chaff-dispensing mechanism.
Therefore, Royal Navy engineers designed an improvised delivery system of welding rods, split pins and string, which allowed six packets of chaff to be stored in the airbrake well and be deployed in flight. It was often referred to as the "Heath Robinson chaff modification", due to its complexity.

JAFF and CHILL
One of the important qualities of chaff is that it is lightweight, allowing large amounts to be carried. As a result, after release it quickly loses any forward speed it had from the aircraft or rocket launcher, and then begins to fall slowly to the ground. From the viewpoint of an enemy radar, the chaff quickly decays to zero relative velocity. Modern radars use the Doppler effect to measure the line-of-sight velocity of objects, and can thus distinguish chaff from an aircraft, which continues to move at high speed. This allows the radar to filter out the chaff from its display.

To counteract this filtering, the JAFF or CHILL technique has been developed. This uses an additional jammer broadcaster on the aircraft to reflect a signal off the chaff cloud that has the proper frequency to match that of the aircraft. This makes it impossible to use Doppler shift alone to filter out the chaff signal. In practice, the signal is deliberately noisy in order to present multiple false targets.

In essence, the JAFF technique is a low-cost offboard decoy, moving the jammers from the launcher platform to the decoy, and using the chaff as a reflector to provide angular separation.

Modern chaff
While foil chaff is still used by certain aircraft, such as the Boeing B-52 Stratofortress bomber, this type is no longer manufactured. The chaff used by aircraft such as the Fairchild-Republic A-10 Thunderbolt II, McDonnell Douglas F-15 Eagle, General Dynamics F-16 Fighting Falcon, and McDonnell Douglas F/A-18 Hornet consists of aluminium-coated glass fibres. The chaff is carried in tubular cartridges, which remain attached to the aircraft, each typically containing around 3 to 5 million chaff fibres. The chaff is ejected from the cartridge by a plastic piston driven by a small pyrotechnic charge.

See also
Anti-ballistic missile
Countermeasure
Infrared countermeasure
Electronic countermeasure
Flare (countermeasure)
SRBOC (Super Rapid-Blooming Offboard Chaff), a shipboard chaff system

References

Sources
Goebel, Greg. The Wizard War: WW2 & The Origins Of Radar v.2.0.2, retrieved 2021-05-26

External links

 BBC: The History of Radar
 Obituary of Joan Curran in The Independent, Feb 19, 1999 by Tam Dalyell
 Window, The History of Sun Engraving and Sun Printers
 Global Security.org Discussion of Chaff
 RAF Window at the International Bomber Command Centre Digital Archive.

British inventions
Military equipment introduced from 1940 to 1944
Military technology
Penetration aids
Weapons countermeasures
World War II Allied electronics
World War II British electronics